The mountain finches are birds in the genus Leucosticte from the true finch family, Fringillidae. This genus also includes the rosy finches, named from their pinkish plumage.

The genus is a sister to the monotypic Procarduelis containing the Asian dark-breasted rosefinch. These birds are native to Asia and North America and are typically found in barren mountainous regions. Many species eat more insect material than other finches.

There are six species in the genus:

References